Love's Masquerade may refer to:
 Love's Masquerade (1928 film), a German silent film
 Love's Masquerade (1922 film), an American silent drama film